Route 81 is a numbered state highway running  in Rhode Island. Route 81's southern terminus is at Rhode Island Route 179 in Little Compton and the northern terminus is a continuation as Massachusetts Route 81 near Fall River, Massachusetts.

History

Major intersections

See also

References

External links

2019 Highway Map, Rhode Island

081
Transportation in Newport County, Rhode Island
Little Compton, Rhode Island
Tiverton, Rhode Island